Sugia stygia is a moth of the family Noctuidae first described by Arthur Gardiner Butler in 1878. It is found in Japan, Korea, India, Sri Lanka, Taiwan and China.

Adult wingspan is 21–27 mm. A white streak near the wings' trailing edge is shaped roughly like the digit "3".

References

Moths of Asia
Moths described in 1878
Acontiinae